A Shyam Gopal Varma Film (Telugu: ఎ శ్యామ్ గోపాల్ వర్మ ఫిల్మ్) is a 2015 Telugu feature film directed by debutante C.S.Reddy alias Rakesh Srinivas, is a satirical crime thriller arguably based on popular Indian film director Ram Gopal Varma. The lead role is played by Shafi. The background score is performed by Mantra Anand, cinematography by Rahul Shrivatsav and editing by Karthika Srinivas.

Synopsis
When a popular crime film director gets kidnapped, he realizes the plot is thicker than his own films.

Cast
Shafi
 Zoya Khan
 Shiva Krishna
 LB Sriram
 Jaya Prakash Reddy
 Jeeva
 Telangana Sakunthala
 Prithvi Raj
 Surya
 Kondavalasa
 Satyam Rajesh
 Narsing Yadav
 Chanti
 Prabhas Srinu
 Gundu Hanumantha Rao
 Sivannaarayana
 Vasu Inturi
 Harish Koyilagndla
 Rajkaran Singh

Production
The theatrical trailer of the film was released on 1 September 2014 during a press meet. The film's audio was released by eminent writer Yandamoori Veerendranath during an event at Prasad Labs, Hyderabad on 9 December 2014. The film was released on 1 January 2015.

Reception
The film received at best a mixed response from public. Some reviewers rated it as a cult film. The Times of India commented that it was an "engrossing movie".

References

External links
 
Ragalahari.com
Supergoodmovies.com
Daccanchronicle.com
Telugucinema.com
Indiaglitz/com

2010s crime comedy films
2015 films
Indian crime comedy films
Indian satirical films
2010s Telugu-language films
2015 comedy films
2010s satirical films